Emotions in Motion is the third studio album by American rock musician Billy Squier. It contains the hit song "Everybody Wants You", which peaked at #32 on the Billboard Hot 100, and stayed at #1 on the Mainstream Rock Tracks chart for 6 weeks.

Other notably successful hits from the album included the singles "Emotions in Motion" and "She's a Runner". Some album cuts such as "Keep Me Satisfied" and especially "Learn How to Live" also received strong radio play and were issued as singles at some countries.

Emotions in Motion is one of Billy Squier's most popular albums, certified Gold in September 1982 and Platinum a month later. Though multi-platinum awards were not certified prior to late 1984, the album received a double platinum award in 1991. Emotions in Motion is also Billy's second best selling album, after the previous year's triple platinum Don't Say No.

The cover art was created for Squier by Andy Warhol. It was also the first of three consecutive albums from Squier to feature a guest appearance from one or more members of Queen – lead singer Freddie Mercury and drummer Roger Taylor sing backing vocals on the title track. Like its predecessor, the album was produced by Squier with Reinhold Mack, also known for Queen's The Game.

Track listing

Personnel
Billy Squier - lead vocals, guitars
Kevin Osborn - guitars
Jeff Golub - guitars
Alan St. Jon - keyboards, synthesizers, backing vocals
Doug Lubahn - bass, backing vocals
Bobby Chouinard - drums
Dino Solera - saxophones on 2, 7 and 9
Freddie Mercury, Roger Taylor - backing vocals on "Emotions in Motion", "emotional" support

Production
Billy Squier: producer, mixing
Reinhold Mack: producer
Gary Rindfuss: engineer, assistant engineer
David Thoener: mixing
Jim Ball: mixing assistant
George Marino: mastering

References

1982 albums
Billy Squier albums
Albums produced by Reinhold Mack
Capitol Records albums
Albums with cover art by Andy Warhol